GNOME Character Map, formerly known as Gucharmap, is a free and open-source software Unicode character map program, part of GNOME. This program allows characters to be displayed by Unicode block or script type. It includes brief descriptions of related characters and occasionally meanings of the character in question. Gucharmap can also be used to input or enter characters (by copy and paste). The search functionality allows the use of several search methods, including by Unicode name or code point of the character. It is built on the GTK toolkit and can be run on any platform supported by GTK. A number of text programs use Gucharmap for character input.

History
Version 0.1 of the program was released on December 13, 2002 with basic Unicode font viewing capabilities which were slowly developed. On July 2, 2003 it was decided that Gucharmap would be included in GNOME 2.4. Two months later on September 10 version 1.0.0 was released with bug fixes and translation updates for inclusion with GNOME 2.4.

See also
 KCharSelect (a KDE character mapping tool)
 Private Character Editor
 Character Map (equivalent program bundled with Windows)
 BabelMap (freeware program for Windows with similar functions)

References

External links
 

GNOME Core Applications
Software that uses GTK
Free software programmed in C